Nedvěd (feminine Nedvědová) is a Czech surname. It is an old variant of the Czech word Medvěd, which means 'bear'.

The following people have the surname Nedvěd:

 František Nedvěd (born 1947), Czech singer and songwriter
 Jan Nedvěd (born 1946), Czech singer and songwriter
 Jaroslav Nedvěd (born 1969), Czech professional ice hockey player, brother of Petr
 Karel Nedvěd, Bohemian track and field athlete who competed at the 1900 Summer Olympics
 Karim Walid (born 1997), Egyptian professional football player nicknamed Nedvěd.
 Marta Nedvědová, Czech sport shooter
 Miroslav Nedvěd, Czechoslovak slalom canoer
 Pavel Nedvěd (born 1972), retired Czech football player
 Petr Nedvěd (born 1971), retired Czech professional ice hockey player
 Vladimír Nedvěd (1917–2012), Czechoslovak-born Australian World War II veteran and war hero
 Zdeněk Nedvěd (born 1975), Czech professional ice hockey player

See also
 Medved (disambiguation)
 Medvedev, Russian surname

References

Czech-language surnames
Surnames from nicknames